Here's to You may refer to:
 Here's to You (radio program), a Canadian radio program on CBC Radio 2
 "Here's to You" (song), a 1971 song by Joan Baez and Ennio Morricone about the anarchists Sacco and Vanzetti, referred to as "Nicola and Bart"
 "Here's to You", a 2004 song from the Rascal Flatts album Feels Like Today
 Here's to You (David Oliver album)
 Here's to You (Montgomery Gentry album), 2018